The Group I Intron Sequence and Structure Database (GISSD) is a database of Group I catalytic intron.

See also
 Group I catalytic intron

References

External links
 http://www.rna.whu.edu.cn/gissd/

Biological databases
Ribozymes
RNA splicing